The A690 is a road in North East England, running from Sunderland in the east through Durham to Crook.

Route

Sunderland section
Throughout the Sunderland section it is known as either Durham Road or New Durham Road, and is one of the major routes in and out of the city. A single carriageway section runs from the city centre to a large roundabout at the Barnes. The road then climbs a steep hill toward High Barnes, alongside the Bede site of the Sunderland College before becoming dual carriageway. Beyond a set of traffic lights at the Prospect Hotel, the road remains dual carriageway, but the inside lane is a 'no car lane'. (In early 2009 the Prospect Hotel was demolished to make way for a new Lidl store.) The road then climbs another hill, becoming single carriageway, with the Farringdon estate to the east and the Thorney Close estate to the west. A down hill stretch leads into the East Herrington and then on toward the A19 fly-over. Within the first mile after the A19, the road comes to a notoriously bad intersection - which is frequented by a speed camera van on the Eastbound carriageway just outside the Evans Halshaw. The road then runs through Houghton-le-Spring, via a locally famous transport feature named Houghton Cut. This huge cut through the hillside was reputedly built with the forced labour of Napoleonic prisoners of war. The road then runs out of the City of Sunderland boundary and on toward the A1.

Houghton Cut

The Houghton Cut "carries the A690 over the steep and prominent Magnesian Limestone escarpment at Houghton". In 1815, French prisoners of war blasted this cut deeper than it already was, to improve the road to Sunderland's port. It was blasted again for the same reason in the 1930s, and "the Germans are said to have helped by bombing it". From 1968 to 1970 it was widened again.

Durham section

References

External links

Transport in the City of Sunderland
Roads in England
Transport in County Durham
Transport in Tyne and Wear